Algernon Percy may refer to:

Algernon Percy, 10th Earl of Northumberland (1602–1668), English military leader
Algernon Percy, 1st Earl of Beverley (1750–1830), peer known as Lord Algernon Percy from 1766–86
Hon. Algernon Percy (diplomat) (1779–1833), son of 1st Earl of Beverley, Minister to the Swiss Cantons
Algernon Percy, 4th Duke of Northumberland (1792–1865), British aristocrat and Conservative politician
Algernon Percy, 6th Duke of Northumberland (1810–1899), British Conservative politician
Lord Algernon Percy (1851–1933), British Conservative Party politician and career soldier

See also
 For other people with the given name Algernon, see Algernon
 For other people with the surname Percy, see Percy
 For other uses of Algernon, see Algernon
 For other uses of Percy, see Percy